This is a list of field hockey players who have appeared for the India men's national field hockey team.

List

References

Lists of field hockey players
Field hockey international
Indian hockey-related lists